Coole is a commune in the Marne department in north-eastern France.

Geography
Coole is situated at the intersection of the N4 highway and the D4 road. The N4 connects Sézanne to the east with Vitry-le-François to the west. The D4 goes south to Sompuis and north to Coolus, near Châlons-en-Champagne. The town is near the source of the Coole River which flows northward before emptying into the Marne River near Coolus.

On the 1757 map drawn by César-François Cassini de Thury, the original name of the river was Côle and the name of the town was Cosle.

References
Notes

Sources

See also
Communes of the Marne department

Communes of Marne (department)